is a Japanese abbreviation for , meaning Tuesday at 9PM. This is a popular time-slot which airs Japanese television dramas. Kakku is Fuji TV's second best-rated time-slot for TV dramas, behind Getsuku (Monday at 9PM). Prior to airing dramas, the time-slot was occupied by the popular quiz show Naruhodo! The World, which ran for a period of fourteen years. The first drama to air on this time-slot was Minikui Ahiru no Ko (1996), starring Goro Kishitani and Takako Tokiwa.

List of Kakku television dramas

1990s
1996
Minikui Ahiru no Ko
Nurse no Oshigoto
Konna Watashi ni Dare ga Shita

1997
Odoru Daisōsasen
Sōri to Yobanaide
Tsuki no Kagayaku Yoru Dakara
Nurse no Oshigoto 2

1998
Kirakira Hikaru
With Love
Kamisama, Mō Sukoshi Dake
Naguru Onna

1999
Kyūmei Byōtō Nijūyoji
Furuhata Ninzaburō (Season 3)
Shōshimin Kane
Out: Tsumatachi no Hanzai

2000s
2000
Omiai Kekkon
Nurse no Oshigoto 3
Henshūō

2001
Joshi Ana.
Shin Omizu no Hanamichi
Kyūmei Byōtō Nijūyoji (Season 2)
Sayonara, Ozu-sensei

2002
Hatsutaiken
Seikei Bijin
Nurse no Oshigoto 4
Double Score

2003
Okaa-san to Issho
Kao
Water Boys
Anata no Tonari ni Dareka Iru

2004
Fire Boys: Megumi no Daigo
Wonderful Life
Water Boys 2
Medaka

2005
Kyūmei Byōtō Nijūyoji (Season 3)
Rikon Bengoshi: Handsome Woman
Umizaru Evolution
1 Litre no Namida

2006
Ns' Aoi
Attention Please
Dandori: Dance Drill
Yakushadamashii!

2007
Konshū, Tsuma ga Uwaki Shimasu
Hanayome to Papa
Hanazakari no Kimitachi e
Abarenbō Mama

2008
Honey and Clover
Zettai Kareshi: Kanzen Muketsu no Koibito Robot
Shibatora: Dougan Keiji Shibata Taketora
Celeb to Binbo Tarō

2009
Mei-chan no Shitsuji
Atashinchi no Danshi
Kyūmei Byōtō Nijūyoji (Season 4)
Otomen: Aki
Liar Game 2

2010s
2010
Nakanai to Kimeta Hi
Zettai Reido: Mikaiketsu Jiken Tokumei Sōsa
Joker: Yurusarezaru Sōsakan
Freeter, Ie o Kau.

2011
Control: Hanzai Shinri Sōsa
Namae o Nakushita Megami
Zettai Reido: Tokushu Hanzai Sennyū Sōsa
Nazotoki wa Dinner no Ato de
2012
 Strawberry Night
 Legal High
 Iki mo Dekinai Natsu
 Osozaki no Himawari ~Boku no Jinsei, Renewal~
2013
 Last Hope
 Kamo, Kyoto e Iku.
 Kyūmei Byōtō Nijūyoji (Season 5)
 Miss Pilot
2014
 Fukuie Keibuho no Aisatsu
 Bitter Blood
 Asunaro 337 Byoshi
 Subete ga F ni Naru
2015
 Ghost Writer
Japanese entertainment terms